Fremont is a 2023 drama film directed by Babak Jalali and co-written by Carolina Cavalli. 

It follows Donya, a young woman from Afghanistan who previously worked as a translator for US troops and has since moved to Fremont, California. Her humdrum life takes a turn when she gets a job writing the fortunes at a fortune cookie factory. The film premiered at the Sundance Film Festival in the NEXT section on January 20, 2023 and screened at the 2023 SXSW Film Festival.

Cast
Anaita Wali Zada as Donya
Gregg Turkington as Dr. Anthony
Jeremy Allen White as Daniel

Reception
On the review aggregator website Rotten Tomatoes, Fremont has a 94% approval rating based on 17 reviews.

Reviewing the film for Variety, Tomris Laffry wrote, "The biggest achievement of Jalali here is the precise tone that he strikes with his mild-mannered movie: never cutesy...and always several feet deeper in its themes and deliberations around human isolation than meets the eye. Communicating with expressively wide-set eyes and the resolute gaze of someone who always knows and observes more than they admit, Zada's performance helps achieve the film's tricky balance...As the film's wistful lead, Zada gives the minor-key impression of an intriguing personality worth getting to know better and, who knows, maybe even solve the mysteries of the universe together." Laffry concluded, "In its final moments, the potency of Fremont sneaks up on you. You go in reluctant and even skeptical, and come out wondering how and why you're moved to tears."

References

External links 

 

2023 films
2023 drama films
2023 independent films
American black-and-white films
Asian-American drama films
Films set in the San Francisco Bay Area
Films about immigration to the United States